Hakim Tafer  (born 27 August 1967) is a French-Algerian boxer. He is a three-time world title challenger.

Career
The European Champion in the Cruiserweight division in 1992, 1993 and 1996, Tafer fought three times for the WBC World Championship: on October 16, 1993, against Anaclet Wamba (throw the towel in  the 7th round) and twice against Marcelo Fabian Dominguez (by TKO and by points).

Professional boxing record

|-
|align="center" colspan=8|23 Wins (15 knockouts, 8 decisions), 7 Losses (5 knockouts, 2 decisions), 1 Draw 
|-
| align="center" style="border-style: none none solid solid; background: #e3e3e3"|Result
| align="center" style="border-style: none none solid solid; background: #e3e3e3"|Record
| align="center" style="border-style: none none solid solid; background: #e3e3e3"|Opponent
| align="center" style="border-style: none none solid solid; background: #e3e3e3"|Type
| align="center" style="border-style: none none solid solid; background: #e3e3e3"|Round
| align="center" style="border-style: none none solid solid; background: #e3e3e3"|Date
| align="center" style="border-style: none none solid solid; background: #e3e3e3"|Location
| align="center" style="border-style: none none solid solid; background: #e3e3e3"|Notes
|-align=center
|Draw
|
|align=left| Valeriy Vykhor
|PTS
|8
|10/04/1999
|align=left| Bercy, France
|align=left|
|-
|Loss
|
|align=left| Marcelo Fabian Dominguez
|UD
|12
|16/08/1997
|align=left| La Palestre, Le Cannet, France
|align=left|
|-
|Win
|
|align=left| Onebo Maxime
|PTS
|8
|01/02/1997
|align=left| Echirolles, France
|align=left|
|-
|Win
|
|align=left| "Russian" Alexey Ilyin
|TKO
|4
|25/05/1996
|align=left| Yubileiny Sports Palace, Saint Petersburg, Russia
|align=left|
|-
|Win
|
|align=left| Valeriy Vykhor
|PTS
|8
|30/01/1996
|align=left| Lille, France
|align=left|
|-
|Loss
|
|align=left| Marcelo Fabian Dominguez
|TKO
|9
|25/07/1995
|align=left| Saint-Jean-de-Luz, France
|align=left|
|-
|Win
|
|align=left| Eugene Taima
|TKO
|6
|17/01/1995
|align=left| Palais des sports Marcel Cerdan, Levallois-Perret, France
|align=left|
|-
|Loss
|
|align=left| Carl "The Cat" Thompson
|TKO
|6
|14/06/1994
|align=left| Epernay, France
|align=left|
|-
|Win
|
|align=left| Ken "Doll" Jackson
|KO
|2
|10/05/1994
|align=left| Echirolles, France
|align=left|
|-
|Win
|
|align=left| Roy Bedwell
|KO
|1
|09/04/1994
|align=left| Albertville, France
|align=left|
|-
|Loss
|
|align=left| Anaclet Wamba
|TKO
|7
|16/10/1993
|align=left| Palais Marcel Cerdan, Levallois-Perret, France
|align=left|
|-
|Win
|
|align=left| Ricky Parkey
|PTS
|8
|24/06/1993
|align=left| Vélodrome du Lac, Bordeaux, France
|align=left|
|-
|Win
|
|align=left| Dmytro Yeliseyev
|KO
|6
|11/02/1993
|align=left| Romorantin-Lanthenay, France
|align=left|
|-
|Win
|
|align=left| Derek Angol
|KO
|10
|22/10/1992
|align=left| Epernay, France
|align=left|
|-
|Win
|
|align=left| Fernando Aiello
|RTD
|6
|12/06/1992
|align=left| Alencon, France
|align=left|
|-
|Win
|
|align=left| Dennis Andries
|MD
|12
|27/02/1992
|align=left| Salle de la Bulle, Beausoleil, Alpes-Maritimes, France
|align=left|
|-
|Win
|
|align=left| Howard "Butch" Kelly
|TKO
|2
|24/01/1992
|align=left| Gennevilliers, France
|align=left|
|-
|Win
|
|align=left| Eddie "Vindaloo" Curry
|KO
|2
|17/05/1991
|align=left| Dieppe, Seine-Maritime, France
|align=left|
|-
|Win
|
|align=left| Boubakar Sanogo
|KO
|2
|19/04/1991
|align=left| Marignane, France
|align=left|
|-
|Win
|
|align=left| Carl "Little Truth" Williams
|KO
|5
|16/02/1991
|align=left| Gaillard, France
|align=left|
|-
|Win
|
|align=left| Boubakar Sanogo
|TKO
|4
|19/05/1990
|align=left| Montpellier, France
|align=left|
|-
|Win
|
|align=left| Fernando Aiello
|PTS
|8
|20/04/1990
|align=left| Guastalla, Italy
|align=left|
|-
|Win
|
|align=left| Ngoy Muamba
|PTS
|6
|07/04/1990
|align=left| Echirolles, France
|align=left|
|-
|Loss
|
|align=left| Mohamed Zaoui
|TKO
|5
|18/11/1989
|align=left| Echirolles, France
|align=left|
|-
|Win
|
|align=left| Paul Gimenez
|PTS
|6
|11/03/1989
|align=left| Perpignan, France
|align=left|
|-
|Loss
|
|align=left| Christophe Girard
|PTS
|6
|25/02/1989
|align=left| Romorantin-Lanthenay, France
|align=left|
|-
|Win
|
|align=left| Germain Djida
|PTS
|6
|16/12/1988
|align=left| Echirolles, France
|align=left|
|-
|Win
|
|align=left| Jean Marc Dindin
|TKO
|3
|26/11/1988
|align=left| Pontcharra, France
|align=left|
|-
|Win
|
|align=left| Hassan Jalni
|TKO
|6
|19/11/1988
|align=left| Echirolles, France
|align=left|
|-
|Win
|
|align=left| Pascal Neodo
|TKO
|4
|21/10/1988
|align=left| Echirolles, France
|align=left|
|-
|Loss
|
|align=left| Norbert Ekassi
|TKO
|3
|03/10/1988
|align=left| Stade Pierre de Coubertin, Bercy, France
|align=left|
|}

Trivia
Tafer is the uncle of the Algerian footballer Yannis Tafer.

External links 
 
 Hakim Tafer Boxrec Encyclopedia

1967 births
Sportspeople from La Tronche
Cruiserweight boxers
Living people
French sportspeople of Algerian descent
French male boxers